Harlows Creek is a stream in Wahkiakum County in the U.S. state of Washington. The name of the stream originally was Jim Crow Creek until it was changed by the U.S. Board of Geographic Names effective May 10, 2017 as part of an nationwide effort to remove offensive and/or derogatory names from geographic features. The new name commemorates John (1872-1953) and Mary (1888-1963) Harlow, who lived in the area during the 1870s.

The origin of the name Jim Crow Creek is unclear, but most likely was a reference to Jim Saules, a free black man who worked and lived in the area in the 1800's.

Harlows Creek originates high on the slopes of Elk Mountain and flows south to the Columbia River, entering the river just east of the historical community of Brookfield. Harlows Creek has one named tributary, Fink Creek.

An early 20th century work suggested the point was named for crows that nested there. However, this reference also suggests a tree growing on the point could be seen far out at sea, an idea which should not be taken seriously due to distance as well as geographic features, so the reference itself might have little value.

See also
List of rivers of Washington

References

Rivers of Wahkiakum County, Washington
Rivers of Washington (state)